{{DISPLAYTITLE:C20H24O4}}
The molecular formula C20H24O4 may refer to:

 Bipinnatin_J
 Crocetin, a natural carotenoid dicarboxylic acid found in the crocus flower
 Dithymoquinone
 5-Geranyloxy-7-methoxycoumarin
 16α-LE2
 Macelignan, a lignan found in the nutmeg